Morton Shulman  (25 April 1925 – 18 August 2000) was a Canadian politician, businessman, broadcaster, columnist, coroner, and physician. He was born in Toronto, Ontario in 1925 to a Jewish family. He first came to fame as Ontario's Chief Coroner in the early 1960s. During this period, he also became a very successful stock-market player, and authored a bestselling book about how to make money in the stock market. In the mid-1960s he embarrassed the provincial government when he found them to be disobeying provincial health and safety laws. He was fired and then ran for elected office in the Legislative Assembly of Ontario, avenging himself by beating a government Member of Provincial Parliament (MPP). He completed two terms as the High Park electoral district's MPP, and did not run in the 1975 Ontario general election. His fame grew in the late 1970s and 1980s when he hosted a nationally distributed television talk show called The Shulman File. He was diagnosed with Parkinson's disease in the early 1980s and became a pharmaceutical entrepreneur specializing in treatments for that disease. Near the end of his life, he received recognition for his lifetime's work, when he was appointed to the Order of Canada, the country's highest civilian award. He died in Toronto in the year 2000.

Biography 
Born in Toronto, Ontario, Shulman received his Doctor of Medicine from the University of Toronto in 1948. Shulman practiced throughout his professional life with a general practice on Roncesvalles Avenue in Toronto. He became wealthy through investing in the stock market and wrote a bestselling book, Anyone Can Make a Million in 1966. He was married to Gloria Shulman (née Bossin) and they had two children, environmental lawyer Dianne Saxe and Dr. Geoff Shulman.

Coroner 
In exchange for his involvement in the Ontario Progressive Conservative Party, he was appointed Ontario's chief coroner in 1961. In 1963, he was named Chief Coroner of the Municipality of Metropolitan Toronto. Shulman was outspoken and used his position as coroner to crusade on a number of issues such as enacting tougher regulations on lifejackets for small boats, having government regulate car safety, the introduction of breathalysers into Ontario, and against then-restrictive abortion laws after he investigated the deaths of women who had died while trying to terminate their pregnancies. In other crusades, he helped to force surgeons to count instruments before and after surgery, and construction companies to provide better bracing in trenches. His years as a coroner became the inspiration for the Canadian television drama Wojeck.

Political career 
After embarrassing the Progressive Conservative (Tory) provincial government, by revealing its inaction in enforcing the fire code in a recently built hospital, he was fired, in 1967, as Metropolitan Toronto's Chief Coroner. He decided to avenge himself by running for a seat in the Legislative Assembly of Ontario. Despite ideological differences, he ran for the Ontario New Democratic Party (NDP) in the High Park electoral district, where his medical clinic was located. Despite his strong capitalist beliefs, he decided to run for the social democratic party because they gave him a free hand in choosing where to run, and because their views in support of public safety were compatible with his.  He was elected as a Member of Provincial Parliament (MPP) in the 1967 provincial election, by defeating High Park's incumbent MPP, Progressive Conservative Alfred Hozack Cowling by over 6200 votes.

He used his position in the legislature to become a thorn in the side of the Tory governments led by John Robarts and Bill Davis. He asked provocative questions in the legislature and was known for stunts, such as selling the book The Happy Hooker out of his office after it had been banned by the Toronto Police morality squad — he offered MPPs a 10 percent discount. Once, to make a point about lax security, he carried a pellet gun — dressed up to look like a submachine gun — in a bag through an Ontario nuclear plant, and then pulled it out on the floor of the Legislature. He waved it around happily while cabinet ministers sitting across from him hid under their desks. He wrote the book "MPP" to describe his experiences, one of at least three autobiographies that he wrote.
Shulman demanded that he be appointed Attorney General if the NDP ever won government. NDP leader Stephen Lewis refused to commit to making such a promise. After clashing with his colleagues in the NDP — particularly Lewis — Shulman decided to leave the legislature and did not run in the 1975 election.

The Shulman File 
After leaving politics, he started a broadcasting career, most notably from 1977 until 1983, he hosted a hard-hitting television talk show on CITY-TV called The Shulman File which featured confrontational interviews, sensationalist and risqué topics and outrageous opinions. The show was spoofed by SCTV as Murray's File. At the same time, he began writing a regular column in the Toronto Sun which continued into the 1990s.  During this period, he became more involved in the financial community, heading up a mutual fund and pursuing various business interests.

Deprenyl 
Shulman was diagnosed with Parkinson's disease in 1983, and formed a company, Deprenyl Research Ltd. (which became Draxis Health Inc.), in order to acquire Canadian rights to the anti-Parkinson's drug Deprenyl. His company engaged in a long fight with the federal government for approval of the drug for sale in Canada. He also started a second pharmaceutical company, called DUSA, now run by his son.

Honours and death 
In 1993, Shulman was awarded the Order of Canada, and was invested as an Officer of the Order on 6 January 1994. After battling Parkinson's disease for more than 17 years, he finally succumbed to the complications arising from that disease at the Baycrest Centre for Geriatric Care in Toronto on August 18, 2000. He was buried in Pardes Shalom Cemetery on Dufferin Street two days later. In 2013, a street leading to Ontario's new forensic services and coroner's complex, in Toronto's North York area, was named Morton Shulman Avenue.

See also 
 Larry Campbell (Canadian coroner and politician compared to Morton Shulman)
 Quincy, M.E. (U.S. TV series inspired in part by the career of Morton Shulman)
 Wojeck (Canadian TV series inspired in part by the career of Morton Shulman)

References

Bibliography

External links 
 
 Morton Shulman fonds, Ontario Archives.
 City of Toronto Document detailing "Shulman Avenue."

1925 births
2000 deaths
Businesspeople from Toronto
Canadian coroners
Canadian general practitioners
Canadian television hosts
Neurological disease deaths in Ontario
Deaths from Parkinson's disease
Jewish Canadian politicians
Ontario New Democratic Party MPPs
Officers of the Order of Canada
Politicians from Toronto
University of Toronto alumni